William Russell Johnson (born February 22, 1973) is a former Major League Baseball infielder. He prepped at Denham Springs High School then went to Louisiana State University. He was drafted in the first round of the 1994 Major League Baseball Draft by the Houston Astros. In , he was called up to the majors by the Astros, where he remained until .

Tampa Bay Devil Rays
In the middle of the 2000 season, Johnson was traded to the Tampa Bay Devil Rays for reliever Marc Valdes. He moved around several times during the next few years.

Return to Majors
He spent the year coming in off the bench as a first baseman, third baseman, pinch hitter, designated hitter, or outfielder. This made him the second "William Russell Johnson" to play for the Yankees. (Billy Johnson, who has the same first, middle, and last name, but is no relation, played for New York in the 1940s.)

In , he played for the Yankees Triple-A team, and led the International League in walk percentage (14.8%). He spent  in the Pittsburgh Pirates organization, where he hit a combined .261 in 106 games split between Double-A and Triple-A.

References

External links

1973 births
Living people
Denham Springs High School alumni
Baseball players from Baton Rouge, Louisiana
Houston Astros players
Tampa Bay Devil Rays players
New York Yankees players
Major League Baseball third basemen
LSU Tigers baseball players
Jackson Generals (Texas League) players
New Orleans Zephyrs players
Orlando Rays players
Durham Bulls players
Norfolk Tides players
Iowa Cubs players
Columbus Clippers players
Altoona Curve players
Indianapolis Indians players
Baseball players from Shreveport, Louisiana